Oğuzhan may refer to:

 Oğuzhan, a Turkish masculine given name
 Oghuz Khagan, a legendary and semi-mythological Turkic leader
 Oguzhan District, a district of Mary Province, Turkmenistan

See also
 Oghuz (disambiguation)